The pygmy short-horned lizard (Phrynosoma douglasii) is a species of small horned lizard in the family Phrynosomatidae. The species is native to the northwestern United States and adjacent southwestern Canada. Like other horned lizards, it is often called a "horned toad" or "horny toad," but it is not a toad at all. It is a reptile, not an amphibian.

Etymology
The specific name, douglasii, is in honor of Scottish botanist David Douglas.

Identification
The pygmy short-horned lizard is often mistaken for its close relative the greater short-horned lizard (P. hernandesi) which has the same basic body type consisting of small pointed scales around the head and back. Until recent mitochondrial DNA evidence, the greater short-horned lizard was considered to be the same species as the pygmy short-horned lizard. They are now considered distinct species with the pygmy short-horned lizard occupying the northwest portion of the United States and extreme southern British Columbia (now extirpated from Canada). When placed together the two are easily distinguished at full size, the pygmy short-horned lizard being much smaller. The greater short-horned lizard is a highly variable species with different geographic populations exhibiting differences in colour, pattern, and size, with some authorities describing five subspecies. It has a snub-nosed profile and short legs. The trunk is fringed by one row of pointed scales, while the belly scales are smooth. The colour is gray, yellowish, or reddish-brown, and there are two rows of large dark spots on the back. When threatened or aggressive, its colours become more intense.The pygmy short-horned lizard is also a species at risk in Alberta according to the Committee on the Status of Endangered Wildlife in Canada (COSEWIC).

Behavior and ecology
The diet of P. douglasii varies from different habitats, but mostly among age and sex classes; neonates feed among almost exclusively on ants (89%) while adults consume fewer ants (72%) and yearlings consume the lowest proportion of ants (60%).  It is also considered a lizard that tolerates well low temperatures, so it can reach biomes that are not accessible for most other reptiles.

References

Further reading
Bell, Thomas (1828). "Description of a new Species of Agama, brought from the Columbia River by Mr. Douglass [sic]". Transactions of the Linnean Society of London 16: 105–107 + Plate X. ("Agama Douglassii [sic]", new species). (in English and Latin).

External links

Phrynosoma
Lizards of North America
Reptiles of the United States
Fauna of the Western United States
Reptiles described in 1828